Emmie de Wit is a Dutch-American virologist. She is chief of the molecular pathogenesis unit at the Rocky Mountain Laboratories. Her research combines pathogenesis studies with detailed molecular analyses to identify molecular determinants of severe respiratory tract disease within the virus and the host.

Education 
Emmie de Wit is from the Netherlands. She received her Ph.D. in virology in 2006 from Erasmus University Rotterdam. Her research focused on the replication, pathogenesis and transmission of influenza A virus. Her dissertation was titled Molecular determinants of influenza A virus replication and pathogenesis.

Career 
In 2009, de Wit moved to Heinz Feldmann's Laboratory of Virology at the Rocky Mountain Laboratories (RML) to research in the biosafety level 4 laboratory. Here, she focused on the pathogenesis of and countermeasures against Nipah virus, the Middle East Respiratory Syndrome Coronavirus and the 1918 H1N1 influenza A virus (Spanish flu). In 2012, she received a Fellows Award for Research Excellence (FARE) for her research on modeling the transmission cycle of the deadly Nipah virus. From 2014 to 2015, de Wit spent 4 months in a field lab in Monrovia, Liberia in charge of patient diagnostics for several Ebola Treatment Units in the area, to help contain the Ebola virus epidemic in Liberia. Currently, de Wit's research aims to combine pathogenesis studies with detailed molecular analyses to identify molecular determinants of severe respiratory tract disease within the virus and the host. She is chief of the molecular pathogenesis unit at RML.

References 

Year of birth missing (living people)
Place of birth missing (living people)
National Institutes of Health people
21st-century American biologists
21st-century American women scientists
American medical researchers
Women medical researchers
American virologists
Women virologists
Expatriate academics in the United States
Dutch women scientists
21st-century Dutch scientists
Dutch virologists
Erasmus University Rotterdam alumni
Dutch emigrants to the United States
Living people